Edward W. McCaskey (April 27, 1919 – April 8, 2003) was the chairman of the Chicago Bears. He was the husband of Bears principal owner Virginia Halas McCaskey.

Military career
Upon graduating from the University of Pennsylvania, McCaskey served in the 80th Division of the United States Army during World War II for two-and-a-half years. Though he was later injured, he refused the Purple Heart, and was subsequently awarded the Bronze Star Medal and a combat infantry badge.

Personal life
After the war, McCaskey became a salesman and a singer in a band, though lost out to Frank Sinatra to join the Harry James Band as a singer, and in 1943, he married Virginia Halas, daughter of Bears founder, owner and head coach George Halas. However, George Halas expressed his doubts about McCaskey, sending two "agents", Bert Bell and Art Rooney, owners of the Philadelphia Eagles and Pittsburgh Steelers, respectively, to inspect McCaskey.

Chairman of the Board
In 1967, McCaskey became vice president and treasurer of the Bears. When George Halas died in 1983, Virginia became principal owner, and Ed became chairman of the board with their son, Michael as team president. The following year, McCaskey made his son operating head of the franchise. In 1999, McCaskey relinquished his position as chairman of the board to Michael, who was promoted after various incidents occurred, such as the botched hiring of Dave Wannstedt's replacement and failed attempt to get a new stadium.

Relationship with Brian Piccolo
The summer before McCaskey officially joined the Bears he befriended the Bears player Brian Piccolo, and the two remained close friends until Piccolo's death of cancer in 1970. As the story goes, he was the person behind the idea to put Piccolo and Gale Sayers in the same room - the first interracial roommates in team history.

After Piccolo's death, McCaskey wrote the famous speech that was immortalized in the movie "Brian's Song": "I love Brian Piccolo and I'd like all of you to love him too. Tonight when you hit your knees, please ask God to love him." He was also long time contributor to the Brian Piccolo Cancer Research Fund.

Death
On April 8, 2003, McCaskey died in his Des Plaines, Illinois home; he had been in declining health, and was survived by his wife and eleven children. At his funeral, a "plaintive piano rendition" of the Bears fight song "Bear Down, Chicago Bears" was played. McCaskey left a lasting impact on the Bears, such as befriending Brian Piccolo, and placing him with Gale Sayers in the same room, making them the first interracial roommates. McCaskey wrote a speech dedicated to Piccolo that was recited by Sayers after being awarded the George S. Halas Courage Award, which was later memorialized in the film Brian's Song, which McCaskey was a consultant for.

To honor McCaskey during the 2003 season, the Bears added an orange shamrock-shaped patch to their jerseys with his initials "EWM".

References

1919 births
2003 deaths
Sportspeople from Lancaster, Pennsylvania
Chicago Bears executives
National Football League team presidents
United States Army personnel of World War II
University of Pennsylvania alumni
20th-century American singers
People from Des Plaines, Illinois
Halas family